Massimo Giordano (born 19 February 1971) is an Italian-born operatic tenor who is known for his bel canto repertoire. Giordano was born in Pompei, Italy into an Italian working-class family.

Early life

At the age of 8, Giordano moved with his family to Trieste where he entered into the local conservatory G. Tartini to study the flute. One day after school near the time of his graduation from the conservatory as a flutist he discovered his voice by accident. In an empty classroom he decided to sing a Neapolitan song for fun while a classmate, a pianist with a visual impairment, accompanied him. It was the moment when Giordano realized he had the ability to sing.

He studied singing with Cecilia Fusco at the age of 18 and later graduated from the conservatory “G. Tartini” in Trieste. In 1997 he won the “A. Belli” competition in Spoleto where he also gave his debut in La Clemenza di Tito at the Teatro Lirico.

Professional career

Giordano began his musical career at an early age and debuted on numerous Italian opera stages. Among others he performed in Venice, Reggio Emilia, Rome, Parma, Naples, Modena and eventually at La Scala in Milan.
His debut outside of Italy took place in 2001 at the Salzburg Festivals with Lorin Maazel and Claudio Abbado. Debuts at the Semper Opera in Dresden, the Zurich Opera, the Teatro Real in Madrid and the Theatre du Capitole in Toulouse followed.

Massimo Giordano further performed in:

 Falstaff  at the London Royal Opera 
 L'elisir d'amore at the Vienna State Opera
 La Traviata in Tokyo 
 La Traviata at the Deutsche Oper Berlin 
 Verdi's Requiem in Sydney
 Gianni Schicchi at the Glyndebourne Festival 
 Romeo and Juliet at the Lyric Opera of Chicago and at the Munich State Opera
 La boheme at Berlin Staatsoper 
 Mignon at Carnegie Hall in New York (his New York debut)
 Il trittico, L’Elisir d’Amore, Manon, La Traviata, La bohème and Gianni Schicchi at the New York Metropolitan Opera

In 2005 Massimo Giordano was part of a special performance of Verdi's Requiem at the Vatican in remembrance of the recently deceased Pope John Paul II.

In 2006 Massimo Giordano's appearance in Massenet's Manon with Renée Fleming at the Metropolitan Opera was broadcast on radios worldwide.

In 2007 he performed as Rinuccio in an international television broadcast of Gianni Schicchi in Puccini’s Il trittico for the Metropolitan Opera headed by James Levine.

Massimo Giordano has cooperated among others with the conductors:

 James Levine
 Maurizio Benini
 Riccardo Chailly
 Antonio Pappano 
 Bruno Campanella
 Vladimir Fedoseyev
 Gianluigi Gelmetti
 Claudio Abbado
 Fabio Luisi
 Lorin Maazel
 Zubin Mehta
 Marco Armiliato
 Michel Plasson
 Yuri Temirkanov
 Vladimir Jurowski

First Album

On October 29th 2012 Massimo Giordano signed an exclusive master right agreement with BMG Rights Management. The album marks Giordano’s debut solo recording. Giordano in an interview described the recording of his first album as accomplishing his ultimate dream. The album titled “Amore e Tormento” was recorded with the Ensemble Del Maggio Musicale in Florence, Italy and features signature Italian arias. The Album will be released on 6 May 2013.

Personal life

Giordano is a passionate chess player and adores classical paintings and soccer. In his youth, Giordano enjoyed listening to heavy metal music and is now open to all music genres. He has two children with his wife Alexandrina and resides with his family in northern Italy where his career began.

References

Italian operatic tenors
1971 births
Living people
21st-century Italian male opera singers